Blue Blood and Mutiny: The Fight for the Soul of Morgan Stanley is a non-fiction book by American journalist and historian Patricia Beard. The book was initially published by William Morrow on September 18, 2007.

Overview
The books focuses on the history of investment bank Morgan Stanley and on how a powerful fight within the firm was orchestrated by a group of eight retired executives, led to the removal of its then CEO, Philip J. Purcell. The group was led by S. Parker Gilbert and Robert Scott, a former Morgan Stanley chairman and president respectively. The group carefully worked behind the scenes to publicise Purcell as a Midwestern rustic lacking sophistication and understanding of elite financial markets. Their efforts were aimed at restoring the ethical foundation of the firm and resulted in the triumphant return of John J. Mack to do "first class business in a first class way".

Criticism

—The New York Times

See also
The Last Tycoons
The Great Game: The Emergence of Wall Street as a World Power: 1653–2000
Money and Power

References

External links
Book profile on Amazon.com

2007 non-fiction books
Books about companies
Books about multinational companies
Business books